Martin County Schools is the public school district for Martin County, North Carolina, United States. The district serves the entire county, and there are no other districts within the county.

Elementary schools
Edna Andrews Elementary in Hamilton serving grades PK-5 (NCES ID )
Jamesville Elementary in Jamesville serving grades PK-6 (NCES ID )
East End Elementary in Robersonville serving grades PK-5 (NCES ID )
Rodgers Elementary in Williamston serving grades K-6 (NCES ID )
E J Hayes Elementary in Williamston  serving grades 3-5 (NCES ID )
Williamston Primary in Williamston serving grades PK-2 (NCES ID )

Middle schools
Roanoke Middle School in Robersonville serving grades 6-8 (NCES ID )
Riverside Middle School in Williamston serving grades 6-8 (NCES ID )

High schools
South Creek High School, Robersonville
Bear Grass High School, Williamston (defunct; merged with Roanoke to form South Creek)
Roanoke High School, Robersonville (defunct; merged with Bear Grass to form South Creek)
Riverside High School, Williamston
Jamesville High School, Jamesville (defunct; merged with Williamston to form Riverside)
Williamston High School, Williamston (defunct; merged with Jamesville to form Riverside)

References

External links
Martin County Schools
Martin County School District at educationbug.org

Education in Martin County, North Carolina
School districts in North Carolina